Eldar Ćivić (born 28 May 1996) is a Bosnian professional footballer who plays as a left-back for Nemzeti Bajnokság I club Ferencváros and the Bosnia and Herzegovina national team.

Ćivić started his professional career at Slovácko, before joining Sparta Prague in 2017. A year later, he was loaned to Spartak Trnava. The following year, he signed with Ferencváros.

A former youth international for Bosnia and Herzegovina, Ćivić made his senior international debut in 2018, earning over 20 caps since.

Club career

Early career
Ćivić started playing football at his hometown club Sloboda Tuzla, before joining youth setup of Czech team Slovácko in 2012. He made his professional debut against Příbram on 14 March 2015 at the age of 18. On 2 April 2016, he scored his first professional goal in a triumph over Sparta Prague.

Sparta Prague
In May 2017, Ćivić signed a four-year deal with Sparta Prague. He made his official debut for the side in UEFA Europa League qualifier against Red Star Belgrade on 27 July. Three days later, he made his league debut against Bohemians 1905.

In February 2018, he was loaned to Slovak outfit Spartak Trnava until the end of season.

Ferencváros
In June 2019, Ćivić was transferred to Hungarian team Ferencváros for an undisclosed fee. He made his competitive debut for the side in UEFA Champions League qualifier against Valletta on 24 July. A month later, he made his league debut against Puskás Akadémia. He won his first trophy with the club on 16 June 2020, when they were crowned league champions. On 30 August, he scored his first goal for Ferencváros in a defeat of Zalaegerszeg.

Ćivić debuted in UEFA Champions League away at Barcelona on 20 October.

In March 2022, he extended his contract until June 2025.

He played his 100th game for the side against Qarabağ on 3 August.

International career
Ćivić represented Bosnia and Herzegovina at all youth levels. He also served as captain of the under-21 team under coach Vinko Marinović.

In May 2018, he received his first senior call-up, for friendly games against Montenegro and South Korea. He debuted against the latter on 1 June.

On 18 November 2019, in a UEFA Euro 2020 qualifier against Liechtenstein, Ćivić scored his first senior international goal.

Personal life
Ćivić's older brother Muharem is also a professional footballer.

Career statistics

Club

International

Scores and results list Bosnia and Herzegovina's goal tally first, score column indicates score after each Ćivić goal.

Honours
Spartak Trnava
Slovak Super Liga: 2017–18

Ferencváros
Nemzeti Bajnokság I: 2019–20, 2020–21, 2021–22
Magyar Kupa: 2021–22

References

External links

1996 births
Living people
Sportspeople from Tuzla
Bosniaks of Bosnia and Herzegovina
Bosnia and Herzegovina Muslims
Bosnia and Herzegovina footballers
Bosnia and Herzegovina youth international footballers
Bosnia and Herzegovina under-21 international footballers
Bosnia and Herzegovina international footballers
Bosnia and Herzegovina expatriate footballers
Association football fullbacks
1. FC Slovácko players
AC Sparta Prague players
FC Spartak Trnava players
Ferencvárosi TC footballers
Czech First League players
Slovak Super Liga players
Nemzeti Bajnokság I players
Expatriate footballers in the Czech Republic
Expatriate footballers in Slovakia
Expatriate footballers in Hungary
Bosnia and Herzegovina expatriate sportspeople in the Czech Republic
Bosnia and Herzegovina expatriate sportspeople in Slovakia
Bosnia and Herzegovina expatriate sportspeople in Hungary